Metarbela sphacobapta is a moth in the family Cossidae. It is found in Angola.

References

Natural History Museum Lepidoptera generic names catalog

Endemic fauna of Angola
Metarbelinae
Moths described in 1929